Troitsko-Kolychyovo is a rural locality (a village) in Malyshevskoye Rural Settlement, Selivanovsky District, Vladimir Oblast, Russia. The population was 15 as of 2010.

Geography 
Troitsko-Kolychyovo is located 43 km southwest of Krasnaya Gorbatka (the district's administrative centre) by road. Pervomaysky is the nearest rural locality.

References 

Rural localities in Selivanovsky District